Vaovasamanaia Seilala Mapusua (born 27 February 1980) is a retired Samoan rugby player who last played for the Kubota Spears of the Japanese Top League. Prior to his move to Japan in 2011, he also had long stints with the Highlanders in Super Rugby and London Irish in the Aviva Premiership. He is currently the head coach of Manu Samoa having been appointed in 2020.

Playing career

New Zealand

Mapusua was born in Moto’otua, Samoa, but grew up in Wellington, New Zealand and attended school at Wesley College in Auckland moving south to join Otago for the 2000 provincial season. His strong performances for Otago saw him earn a contract with the Highlanders for the 2002 Super 12 season and he remained a fixture for both Otago and the Highlanders through 2006. By the time he left New Zealand he was only the fifth back to have played more than 50 games for the Highlanders.

England

Mapusua joined London Irish for the 2006–07 Guinness Premiership, and immediately established himself as a top player for the side, scoring 4 tries in 22 matches. He was named the team's top newcomer for his efforts.

In 2008–09, he would have a towering season for London Irish, scoring 9 tries in 27 matches in all competitions and leading the club to the Premiership final. At the conclusion of the season he was named the PRA Players' Player of the Season.

He continued as a regular starter through 2011, and by the conclusion of his stay in London had played 125 games with the side including 91 Premiership matches and 23 Heineken Cup contests.

Japan

In January 2011, Mapusua announced that he was signing in Japan with the Kubota Spears for the 2011–12 season.

International Play

Mapusua made his debut for Samoa against Japan on 17 June 2006 and represented Samoa in the 2007 and 2011 Rugby World Cup.

He has also been selected to the touring Pacific Islanders on three occasions.

Both of his test tries have come against Wales at the Millennium Stadium - for the Pacific Islanders on 11 November 2006, and for Samoa on 13 November 2009.

Coaching
Mapusua retired from rugby in 2016. After returning to New Zealand he worked as a Coaching Development Officer for Otago Rugby.

In August 2020 Mapusua was appointed coach of Manu Samoa.

In December 2020 he was granted the title of Vaovasamanaia.

References

External links
 London Irish profile

Samoan rugby union players
New Zealand rugby union players
New Zealand rugby union coaches
Samoan emigrants to New Zealand
Highlanders (rugby union) players
Otago rugby union players
Barbarian F.C. players
London Irish players
Kubota Spears Funabashi Tokyo Bay players
1980 births
Living people
People educated at Wesley College, Auckland
Samoa international rugby union players
Pacific Islanders rugby union players
Samoan expatriate rugby union players
New Zealand expatriate sportspeople in England
Expatriate rugby union players in England
Expatriate rugby union players in Japan
Samoan expatriate sportspeople in Japan
Samoan expatriate sportspeople in England
Rugby union centres
New Zealand expatriate sportspeople in Japan
Rugby union players from Wellington City
Kamaishi Seawaves players
Samoa national rugby union team coaches
Counties Manukau rugby union players